Tomb Raider: The Prophecy is an action-adventure video game released in November 2002 for the Game Boy Advance, part of the Tomb Raider franchise. It was developed by Ubi Soft Milan, and published by Ubi Soft under license from Eidos Interactive.

Gameplay

Unlike previous handhelds in the series such as the Tomb Raider: Curse of the Sword, which played in a side-scrolling two-dimensional form, reminiscent of 8-bit games, The Prophecy instead plays in an isometric viewpoint, giving the player a viewpoint from above the player character's head. The game contains many familiar elements of the franchise such as being able to jump, run, climb and shoot. As the game was the first Tomb Raider to be rendered in an isometric view until Lara Croft and the Guardian of Light, the game was also given a new combat system to suit the view style. The system does not include the regular player-controlled lock on gun play of previous games. It does instead contain an auto-lock system to make combating enemies easier. There are three weapons that the player can use: Lara's signature handguns, Uzi pistols and golden guns. The controls were designed to be simple, with the directional pad assigned to movement, the A button is used as a jump button, the R button pulls out or holsters weapons, and the L button allows the player to sprint.

Plot
The game is based around an ancient prophecy written in the Tome of Ezekiel, which tells of three magical stones, used by various powerful rulers around the world. Lara Croft must find these stones before a cult known as the Teg-du-Bhorez can collect them all and use them to revive a mystical being known as the Great Grey One, thus bringing about the end of the world. Throughout the game Lara searches for the stones and thinks that she has found them. However, she realises that she was mistaken and has to come back to defeat the game's villain.

Development
The Prophecy was developed as a standalone original project for the Game Boy Advance by the Milan studio of Ubisoft. The development team was eleven people, all veterans of developing for the Game Boy portable console family. Lara's moveset was modelled on the first two Tomb Raider games. A challenge for the team was giving Lara smooth animations within the limited hardware, with one of the sacrifices being the ability to use two-handed weapons such as the shotgun.

Reception

Tomb Raider: The Prophecy received "mixed or average" reviews, according to review aggregator Metacritic.

The game received a -out-of-5 score from GameSpy reviewer Scott Steinberg, who praised it for the aesthetic effects of the game camera, which give the illusion that the player can see into a 3-dimensional space. However, Steinberg criticized the repetitive nature of the game, as it largely consists of the player having to trigger a switch, and opening a door or shutting off a trap, only to come to the next switch and repeat it again. GameSpy concluded that although the game has some merits, it falls short in terms of gameplay standards of many of its greatest assets are related to audio and visuals.

The Prophecy was a runner-up for GameSpots annual "Best Action Game on Game Boy Advance" award, which went to Metroid Fusion.

References

External links

2002 video games
Game Boy Advance games
Game Boy Advance-only games
Single-player video games
Ubisoft games
Video games based on mythology
Video games based on Norse mythology
Video games developed in the United Kingdom
Video games developed in Italy
Video games set in Cambodia
Video games set in Italy
Video games set in Romania
Video games set in Sweden
Video games with oblique graphics
Prophecy